Dübs crane tank No. 4101 is an 0-4-0CT crane locomotive manufactured by Dübs & Co. in 1901, Glasgow for the Shelton Iron and Steel Works, Stoke on Trent. A "crane tank" is a type of steam locomotive upon which a steam-powered crane is mounted, producing a machine which is capable of performing as both a shunter and a mobile crane.

Preservation
On withdrawal from service in 1968, No. 4101 was privately preserved at the East Somerset Railway in 1970, although it was not moved to Somerset until 1973. It was returned to service in 1977 and performed useful work around the railway until 1986, when it was withdrawn for overhaul. The overhaul at the ESR never happened, and 4101 was sold to private owners at the Foxfield Light Railway, near Stoke-on-Trent.

Steam gala 2010
"Dubsy", as the locomotive is affectionately known, returned to steam on 18 July 2010, during the Foxfield Light Railway's steam gala.

In fiction
This class of crane engine forms the basis of the character Harvey the Crane Engine from the Thomas & Friends television series.

References

External links
 Foxfield Railway – Dubs crane tank 4101

Dübs locomotives
0-4-0T locomotives